The biochemical systems equation is a compact equation of nonlinear differential equations for describing a kinetic model for any network of coupled biochemical reactions and transport processes.

The equation is expressed in the following form:

The notation for the dependent variable x varies among authors. For example, some authors use s, indicating species. x is used here to match the state space notation used in control theory but either notation is accepted.

Example 

Given the biochemical network:

The system equation can be written as:

  

So that:

 

The elements of the rate vector will be rate equations that are functions of one or more species  and parameters, p. In the example, these might be simple mass-action rate laws such as  where  is the rate constant parameter. The particular laws chosen will depend on the specific system under study. Assuming mass-action kinetics, the above equation can be written in complete form as:

Analysis 

The system equation can be analyzed by looking at the linear response of the equation around the steady-state with respect to the parameter .  At steady-state, the system equation is set to zero and given by:

This derivation assumes that the stoichiometry matrix has full rank. If this is not the case, then the inverse won't exist.

Example

For example, consider the same problem from the previous section of a linear chain. The matrix  is the unscaled elasticity matrix:

 

In this specific problem there are 3 species and 4 reaction steps, the elasticity matrix is therefore a  matrix. However, a number of entries in the matrix will be zero. The matrix, therefore, will contain the following entries:

 

The parameter matrix depends on which parameters are considered. In Metabolic control analysis, a common set of parameters are the enzyme activities. For the sake of argument, we can equate the rate constants with the enzyme activity parameters. We also assume that each enzyme, only can affect its own step and no other. The matrix  is the unscaled elasticity matrix with respect to the parameters. Since there are 4 reaction steps and 4 corresponding parameters, the matrix will be a 4 by 4 matrix. Since each parameter only affects one reaction, the matrix will be a diagonal matrix:

 

Since there are 3 species and 4 reactions, the resulting matrix  will be a 3 by 4 matrix

Each expression in the matrix describes how a given parameter influences the steady-state concentration of a given species.

Assumptions 

The biochemical systems equation makes two key assumptions:

 Species exist in a well-stirred reactor, so there are no spatial gradients. 
 Species concentrations are high enough so that stochastic effects are negligible

See also

 Stoichiometry matrix
 Chemical reaction network theory
 List of systems biology modeling software

References 

Biochemistry methods
Metabolism
Mathematical and theoretical biology
Systems biology